Dhyan Singh is the name of:

 Dhian Singh, Dogra prime minister of Maharaja Ranjit Singh of Lahore
 Dhyan Chand (1905–1979), Indian field hockey player